Akshat is a popular male given name in Hindu and Buddhist cultures. It is a name derived from the Sanskrit word 'Aksata' meaning, uninjured.

Akshat may refer to:

People
Akshat Chandra (born 1999), American chess prodigy
Akshat Chopra, Indian film actor, model and dancer
Akshat Khamparia (born 1989), Indian chess International Master
Akshat Pandey (born 1993), Indian cricketer
Akshat Singh (born 2005), Indian dancer
Akshat Verma, Indian film director and screenwriter
Akshat Kotwalla (born 2000), Indian Software Developer

See also

References 

Indian masculine given names